Duiven is a railway station located in Duiven, Netherlands. The station was opened on 15 February 1856 and is located on the Oberhausen–Arnhem railway between Arnhem and Elten (Germany). The train services at this station are operated by Arriva and Breng. The station was closed on 4 October 1936, but reopened on 31 May 1980. ICE services pass through this station at high speed.

Train services

Bus services

External links
NS website 
Dutch Public Transport journey planner 

Railway stations in Gelderland
Railway stations opened in 1856
Railway stations on the Rhijnspoorweg
Duiven
1856 establishments in the Netherlands
Railway stations in the Netherlands opened in the 19th century